The 2011 CAF Super Cup (also known as the 2011 Orange CAF Super Cup for sponsorship reasons) was the 19th CAF Super Cup, an annual football match in Africa organized by the Confederation of African Football (CAF), between the winners of the previous season's two CAF club competitions, the CAF Champions League and the CAF Confederation Cup. The match was contested between TP Mazembe of the Democratic Republic of the Congo, the winner of the 2010 CAF Champions League, and FUS Rabat of Morocco, the winner of the 2010 CAF Confederation Cup. TP Mazembe won the trophy after beating FUS Rabat 9–8 in the penalty shoot-out, with the game ending 0–0.

The hosts of the 2015 and 2017 Africa Cup of Nations tournaments were announced at the match.

Teams

Rules
The CAF Super Cup is played over one match, hosted by the winner of the CAF Champions League. Since 2011, the regulations have been changed such that in case of a draw the two teams would directly move to post match penalties (no extra time is played).

Match details

References

External links
CAF Super Cup

Super
2011
TP Mazembe matches
International club association football competitions hosted by the Democratic Republic of the Congo
Association football penalty shoot-outs